iRadio is a music-driven youth radio station broadcast in the Border, West, Mid-East and Midland regions of Ireland. The station is one of four music-driven youth stations that were licensed by the Broadcasting Authority of Ireland to challenge the current duopoly in the 15-34 age bracket for those outside Dublin by national stations RTÉ 2FM and Today FM.

The station, based in Athlone and broadcasting to an average listenership of 227,000, was created by the merger of i102-104FM and i105-107FM on 4 July 2011.

The combined 15-county franchise was awarded a new ten-year license in 2019.

Notable people
 

Claire O'Callaghan, news and sports journalist and radio presenter

See also
 Radio in Ireland

References

External links
 iRadio

Contemporary hit radio stations in Ireland
Radio stations in the Republic of Ireland